Valencic, Valenčič or Valenčić is a surname. Notable people with the surname include:

Filip Valenčič (born 1992), Slovenian footballer
Jože Valenčič (born 1948), Yugoslav cyclist
Mitja Valenčič (born 1978), Slovenian alpine skier
Predrag Valenčić (born 1963), Croatian footballer